Invisible is the fifth full-length studio album by the Swedish rock band Nightingale. The track "Still Alive" is the end of the Breathing Shadow story. The rest of this album is not a concept/story album.

Track listing

Credits

Band members
 Dan Swanö: lead vocals, guitar
 Dag Swanö: backing vocals, guitar, keyboard
 Erik Oskarsson: backing vocals, bass guitar, co-lead vocals on "Atlantis Rising" and "Misery"
 Tom Björn: drums

References

Nightingale (band) albums
2004 albums